The Ballad of Big Al, marketed as Allosaurus in North America, is a 2000 special episode of the nature documentary television series Walking with Dinosaurs. The Ballad of Big Al is set in the Late Jurassic, 145 million years ago, and follows a single Allosaurus specimen nicknamed "Big Al" whose life story has been reconstructed based on a well-preserved fossil of the same name. The Ballad of Big Al was like the other episodes of Walking with Dinosaurs made by Impossible Pictures and was produced by the BBC Natural History Unit, the Discovery Channel, ProSieben and TV Asahi. The episode was aired together with a 30-minute behind-the-scenes episode, Big Al Uncovered.

Plot 

The special begins at the University of Wyoming's Geological Museum, showing the bones of a sauropod followed by an Allosaurus named Big Al. After the ghost of Big Al wanders the museum passing by his own skeleton and a nest of fossilized eggs, the film then travels back in time to 145 Mya showing a similar nest. Al and his siblings hatch and are helped out of the nest by their mother. She brings them to a river bank and the hatchlings start to hunt for insects. When the mother leaves the hatchlings temporarily, a one-year-old Allosaurus comes out of hiding and kills one of them (luckily, the victim was not Al).

Al is then shown at the age of two years. He tries to hunt a flock of Dryosaurus. He has not yet learned how to ambush so he fails to kill one of the swifter, smaller dinosaurs. Later, he snatches a lizard from a branch to keep him satisfied. Al comes across a dead Stegosaurus  and an Allosaurus waiting for death in a pit of sticky mud, which forms a predator trap. Meanwhile, a two-year-old female Allosaurus, attracted to the Stegosaurus carcass, also gets stuck. She struggles to free herself, but fails. Al luckily avoids the same fate, because he has learnt to avoid carrion and the large carnivores that it usually attracts. Unable to escape, the trapped Allosaurus pair die of exhaustion, their corpses left to Anurognathus.

Three years pass, and a herd of Diplodocus are migrating across the prehistoric salt lake, heading for a nesting site to the south. But as the Allosaurus gather for the kill, Al is struck down by the neck of the Diplodocus. The pack decides to wait for a few hours until the Diplodocus is brought down by heat exhaustion and his illness. Though they feed, within the hour, a five-year-old female Allosaurus scavenges the kill. Al takes some remnants of the carcass for himself and leaves, trying to find a safer place to eat.

His presence however makes other dinosaurs around the pond nervous and the smell of blood he brings with him puts off a pair of Stegosaurus that were attempting to mate. Away from the pond, he discovers the scent of a nearby six-year-old female Allosaurus and issues a mating call. She is not interested, but the inexperienced Al persists, and the female turns hostile when he gets too close. Al is lucky enough to escape from the ensuing fight with his life, although he sustains injuries to his right arm as well as smashed ribs. Later the dry season comes, and Al is attempting to hunt a flock of Dryosaurus. Whilst ambushing them however, he trips over a log that falls in his path and ends up breaking something in his right foot in the resultant fall; he limps away, his chances of survival as prey gets scarcer now very unlikely. As the dry season turns to a drought, Al's limp from the fall gets worse and his right middle toe -which he broke in the fall- has become badly infected. Soon, unable to hunt because of this handicap, he dies in a dried-up riverbed, where two hatchling Allosaurus are hunting for bugs and come across his emaciated carcass. He is said not to have reached full size, dying as a mature adolescent and that the process of his fossilisation was so perfect it preserved even the injuries he sustained in his lifetime including -amongst others- lumps where his ribs healed after their break and the raging infection on his middle toe. The narrator concludes the special stating how Big Al, in death, represents a frozen moment in the fast and furious life of a carnivorous dinosaur.

Episodes

Reception

Reviews 
Julie Salamon gave The Ballad of Big Al a positive review in The New York Times, deeming it an excellent follow-up to the original series of Walking with Dinosaurs, praising the computer animation, the authentic animal designs and the presentation of the programme.

Awards 
The Ballad of Big Al won two 2001 Emmy Awards, one for Outstanding Sound Editing for a Non-Fiction Program and one for Outstanding Animated Program (For Programming More Than One Hour). It was also nominated for Outstanding Special Visual Effects (For A Miniseries, Movie Or A Special). The Online Film & Television Association also awarded The Ballad of Big Al with two awards, one for Best Visual Effects in a Series and one for Best Informational Special.

In other media

Children's book
The Ballad of Big Al was adapted into a children's book by Stephen Cole. Titled Allosaurus! The Life and Death of Big Al, the book was published in North America by Dutton Children's Books on 4 June 2001.

Website
An accompanying website to The Ballad of Big Al was launched in 2000, featuring a written retelling of Big Al's story by the researcher Alexandra Freeman and an online role-playing game, the Big Al game, based on the episode.

Notes

References

External links
 

BBC television documentaries
Discovery Channel original programming
Documentary films about dinosaurs
Daytime Emmy Award for Outstanding Animated Program winners
Walking with...

pl:Wędrówki z dinozaurami#Ballada o Wielkim Alu